Boris Boor (born 12 December 1950) is an Austrian equestrian and Olympic medalist. He was born in Bratislava. He won a silver medal in show jumping at the 1992 Summer Olympics in Barcelona.

References

External links

1950 births
Living people
Austrian male equestrians
Olympic equestrians of Austria
Olympic silver medalists for Austria
Equestrians at the 1988 Summer Olympics
Equestrians at the 1992 Summer Olympics
Sportspeople from Bratislava
Olympic medalists in equestrian
Medalists at the 1992 Summer Olympics